The TKO Horns were a horn section formed in 1982 when Big Jim Paterson (trombone), Paul Speare (tenor saxophone) and Brian Maurice (alto saxophone) left Dexys Midnight Runners. After a brief spell touring with Paul Young's Q Tips they began performing on a regular basis with Elvis Costello. Another former Dexy's sax player, Geoff Blythe, soon replaced Maurice and Dave Plews (trumpet) was added as The TKO Horns featured prominently on Costello's 1983 album Punch The Clock.

Over the next few years they performed on records by numerous other artists including Madness, Squeeze, Nick Lowe, Howard Jones and The Fixx. Paul Speare also appeared on The Special A.K.A.'s Nelson Mandela while Paterson and Blythe teamed up again in 1989 as part of a group called The Neighbourhood. More recently Blythe has been a member of Irish-American rock group Black 47.

External links
 http://www.paulspeare.com

British instrumental musical groups